Nir Eliyahu (lit. Eliyahu's Meadow) is a kibbutz in the Sharon plain region of Israel. Located northeast of Kfar Saba, it falls under the jurisdiction of the Drom HaSharon Regional Council.

History
Nir Eliyahu was established in 1950, and was named after the chief architect of the Haganah, Eliyahu Golomb.

In 2005, the film "Sweet Mud" (Adama Meshugat) was filmed in Nir Eliyahu and Ruhama.

Economy
In 1973, the kibbutz established a factory, Plastnir, for production of flexible polyethylene for specialised films for lamination, films for automatic packaging (FFS), printed and plain collation shrink films, bags on roll, heavy duty bags, high and low density bags, shopping bags, merchandise bags and sleeves for banana growers. The films and bags are sold to major retail chains in Israel, Europe and the United States, as well as to many industrial organizations in Israel.

Nir Eliyahu is site of one of Israel's wastewater treatment plants. The plant currently treats wastewater from kibbutzim, moshavim and towns in the region, including Qalqiliya.

References

External links
Official website 
Health Crises in the Making: Protecting water resources requires cooperation with the Palestinian Authority Friends of the Earth Middle East, April 2006

Kibbutzim
Kibbutz Movement
Populated places established in 1950
Populated places in Central District (Israel)
1950 establishments in Israel